In mathematics, an identity element, or neutral element, of a binary operation operating on a set is an element of the set that leaves unchanged every element of the set when the operation is applied. This concept is used in algebraic structures such as groups and rings. The term identity element is often shortened to identity (as in the case of additive identity and multiplicative identity) when there is no possibility of confusion, but the identity implicitly depends on the binary operation it is associated with.

Definitions
Let  be a set  equipped with a binary operation ∗. Then an element  of  is called a  if  for all  in , and a  if  for all  in .

These need not be ordinary addition and multiplication—as the underlying operation could be rather arbitrary. In the case of a group for example, the identity element is sometimes simply denoted by the symbol . The distinction between additive and multiplicative identity is used most often for sets that support both binary operations, such as rings, integral domains, and fields. The multiplicative identity is often called  in the latter context (a ring with unity). This should not be confused with a unit in ring theory, which is any element having a multiplicative inverse. By its own definition, unity itself is necessarily a unit.

Examples

Properties
In the example S = {e,f} with the equalities given, S is a semigroup. In fact, every element can be a left identity. In a similar manner, there can be several right identities. But if there is both a right identity and a left identity, then they must be equal, resulting in a single two-sided identity. 

Another common example is the cross product of vectors, where the absence of an identity element is related to the fact that the direction of any nonzero cross product is always orthogonal to any element multiplied. That is, it is not possible to obtain a non-zero vector in the same direction as the original. Yet another example of structure without identity element involves the additive semigroup of positive natural numbers.

See also

 Absorbing element
 Additive inverse
 Generalized inverse
 Identity (equation)
 Identity function
 Inverse element
 Monoid
 Pseudo-ring
 Quasigroup
 Unital (disambiguation)

Notes and references

Bibliography

Further reading

 M. Kilp, U. Knauer, A.V. Mikhalev, Monoids, Acts and Categories with Applications to Wreath Products and Graphs, De Gruyter Expositions in Mathematics vol. 29, Walter de Gruyter, 2000, p. 14–15

Algebraic properties of elements
Identity element
Properties of binary operations
1 (number)